Elena Likhovtseva and Ai Sugiyama were the defending champions, but Sugiyama chose to compete at Madrid during the same week. Likhovtseva teamed up with Corina Morariu and lost in the first round to Eva Martincová and Sandra Načuk.

Sonya Jeyaseelan and Florencia Labat won the title by defeating Kim Grant and María Vento 6–4, 6–3 in the final.

Seeds

Draw

Draw

References

External links
 Official results archive (ITF)
 Official results archive (WTA)

Internationaux de Strasbourgandnbsp;- Doubles
2000 Doubles
Internationaux de Strasbourg